Gustavo Henrique Cabral de Souza (born 20 December 1999), simply known as Gustavo, is a Brazilian footballer who plays as a right-winger.

Club career
Gustavo made his professional Fortuna Liga debut for FC ViOn Zlaté Moravce against MŠK Žilina on 14 September 2019.

References

External links
 Gustavo Henrique Cabral de Souza at FC ViOn Zlaté Moravce 
 Gustavo Henrique Cabral de Souza at Futbalnet  
 
 

1999 births
Living people
Brazilian footballers
Association football midfielders
FC ViOn Zlaté Moravce players
Slovak Super Liga players
Brazilian expatriate footballers
Brazilian expatriate sportspeople in Slovakia
Expatriate footballers in Slovakia